Alphons Maximilian Pfyffer von Altishofen (also known as Max Alphons Pfyffer; 12 October 1834, in Altishofen – 12 January 1890, in Lucerne) was a Swiss architect, hotelier and military Chief of Staff. He built the Grand Hotel National, which his father-in-law owned.
He hired César Ritz to manage it.
His son Hans Pfyffer took over management of the hotel in 1890 after Ritz had left Lucerne for London to manage the Savoy Hotel.

Selected works
Luzernerhof Hotel, Lucerne, 1864–65
Plan for an avenue to the Lion Monument, Lucerne 1865
Project for a museum on the alpine road in 1866
Hotel National, Lucerne 
Plans for the Kursaal, Lucerne. 1868
Plans for the Gotthard fortress, concept design, design from 1886

References

Jochen Hesse: Pfyffer von Altishofen, Alphons Maximilian. In: "Isabelle Rucki und Dorothee Huber" (Hrsg.): Architektenlexikon der Schweiz - 19./20. Jahrhundert. Birkhäuser, Basel 1998. . S. 420 (in German)
N.N.: Oberst Alphons Pfyffer von Altishofen (Nekrolog). In: Allgemeine schweizerische Militärzeitung. 36 (56), Nr. 3, 1890, S. 17–21 (in German)

External links
 ADB:Pfyffer von Altishofen, Max (German language Wikisource)

1834 births
1890 deaths
People from Lucerne
Swiss hoteliers
Swiss military officers
19th-century Swiss architects